Morar is a small village on the west coast of Scotland,  south of Mallaig. The name Morar is also applied to the northern part of the peninsula containing the village, though North Morar is more usual (the region to the south west of Loch Morar is known as Arisaig, rather than South Morar). The coastline of the area forms part of the Morar, Moidart and Ardnamurchan National Scenic Area, one of 40 such areas in Scotland, which are defined so as to identify areas of exceptional scenery and to ensure its protection by restricting certain forms of development.

Morar has a railway station on the West Highland Line and is by-passed by the A830, part of the Road to the Isles, between Fort William and Mallaig. The village was formed of the farms and crofts of Bourblach, Beoraid Beg and Beoraid Mor with the modern village growing up around the railway station of Morar during the 20th century. The 1911 census suggests that the village name was not yet in regular use at the time, as only the old settlement names are used in it.

The area is famous for its beaches, known as the "White Sands of Morar": one, which featured prominently in the film Local Hero, as well as in Breaking the Waves, is a few miles south of the village. Nearby Loch Morar is the deepest freshwater body in the British Isles and is linked to the sea by the short River Morar.

Morar was a favourite winter travel destination of the noted English composer, Sir Arnold Bax (1883–1953), during the 1930s. He worked on his Third Symphony and each subsequent symphony during his visits to the Station Hotel there.

History

Early history

Following raids by Vikings, the district of Morar became part of the Kingdom of the Isles, a Norwegian dependency. In practice though, by the mid 12th century, the kingdom was divided; the portion containing Morar was known as Garmoran, and ruled by the MacRory. Following the 1266 Treaty of Perth, Garmoran became a Scottish crown dependency - the Lordship of Garmoran - still ruled by the MacRory, until the sole MacRory heir was Amy of Garmoran.

Most of the remainder of the Kingdom of the Isles had become the Lordship of the Isles, ruled by the MacDonalds, whose leader, John of Islay, married Amy. After the birth of three sons, he divorced Amy and married the king's niece, in return for a substantial dowry. As part of the arrangement, John deprived his eldest son, Ranald, of the ability to inherit the Lordship of the Isles, in favour of a son by his new wife; as compensation, he made Ranald the Lord of Garmoran.

However, at the end of the 14th century, on Ranald's death, his sons were still children, and Ranald's younger brother Godfrey took the opportunity to seize the Lordship of Garmoran. Furthermore, the heirs of Ranald's other brother Murdoch now made their own claim. This led to a great deal of violent conflict involving Godfrey's family (the Siol Gorrie) and those of his brothers (which is not described in surviving records in much detail).

In 1427, frustrated with the level of violence generally in the highlands, together with the insurrection caused by his own cousin, King James I demanded that highland magnates should attend a meeting at Inverness. On arrival, many of the leaders were seized and imprisoned. Alexander MacGorrie, son of Godfrey, was considered to be one of the two most reprehensible, and after a quick showtrial, was immediately executed. As Alexander had by now inherited Godfrey's de facto position as Lord of Garmoran, and in view of Ranald's heirs being no less responsible for the violence, King James declared the Lordship forfeit.

Lairdship grants

In 1469, James' grandson (James III) granted Lairdship of the lands of Garmoran and Uist to John, the Lord of the Isles. In turn, John passed it to his own half-brother, Hugh of Sleat; the grant to Hugh was confirmed by the king in a 1493 charter. The violence that led to Alexander's execution had brought the Siol Gorrie to the brink of extinction, and after Alexander's death they played no further part in Morar's history.

Ranald's heirs (Clan Ranald) disputed and fought against the charter. Following Hugh of Sleat's death, in 1498, and for reasons that are not remotely clear, his son John immediately resigned, transferring all authority to the king. In 1539 the king granted Morar to the MacDonells of Glengarry, a group who claimed descent from Ranald's son Donald.

Over the course of the 16th century, following an inheritance dispute over the lands of MacDonalds of Lochalsh, there were several violent encounters between the MacDonells and the MacKenzies. At the end of the century, the MacKenzies now sought to complain about MacDonell behaviour in court, but the MacDonell leadership wouldn't turn up, so in 1602, the MacKenzies laid waste to Morar as punishment. This led to the MacDonells waging battle against the MacKenzies in the Battle of Morar.

Later history

Many houses in the area were used as training schools by the Special Operations Executive during World War II.  The Land, Sea and Islands Centre in Arisaig has a display on the connection between SOE and the area and has published a book on the subject.

Morar Beach served as a location in the 1983 film Local Hero. It was also used in filming Highlander (1986) as the location for the scene in which Ramirez and Connor race along the beach. In the 1995 movie, Rob Roy Morar was used as the location for one of Rob Roy's homes.

Notable people
 Alasdair mac Mhaighstir Alasdair (c.1698-1770), an officer and Gaelic tutor to Prince Charles Edward Stuart during the Jacobite rising of 1745 and poet who wrote many immortal works of Scottish Gaelic literature, spent the last years of his life near Morar as the local Tacksman of Clan MacDonald of Clanranald. After moving permanently to the area, the poet, a recent convert from Protestantism to the still illegal and underground  Catholic Church in Scotland, composed a poem in praise of the priests and students at the clandestine minor seminary in nearby Buorblach.
 Rt.-Rev. Angus Bernard MacEachern (1759-1835), later the first Bishop of the Roman Catholic Diocese of Charlottetown, studied for the priesthood during that same era at the minor seminary at nearby Buorblach.
 BBC weather forecaster Carol Kirkwood (b.1962), is a native of Morar.
Fr. Alexander Macdonnell (1762-1840), a descendant of Clan MacDonald of Glengarry, was received his educated at the clandestine minor seminary at Buorblach, before being sent to continue his priestly training in Spain at the Royal Scots College in Valladolid. After his ordination, Fr. Macdonnell went on to become the first Roman Catholic military chaplain in post-Reformation British military history and the first Bishop of the Diocese of Kingston, in the Canadian Gaelic-speaking immigrant community of Glengarry County, Ontario.
 Morar was, for many years, the home of Fougasse.

See also
Loch Morar

References

External links
 Breaking the Waves filming locations
 Local Hero filming locations
 West Highland Railway Mallaig Extension

Populated places in Lochaber
National scenic areas of Scotland